KSB may refer to:
KSB Hospital
KSB Open, a golf tournament
Kativik School Board
Kashmere Stage Band
Keystone State Boychoir
KSB SE, a German manufacturer
K. K. Setonaikai Broadcasting (KSB), a Japanese television station

See also
KSBS (disambiguation)